Edan Diop (born 24 August 2004) is a French professional footballer who plays as a midfielder for Ligue 1 club Monaco.

Club career
Diop is a youth product of Tours and Chambray FC, before joining the youth academy of Monaco in 2019. He signed his first professional contract with Monaco on 5 August 2022 until 2025. He made his professional debut with Monaco as a substitute in a UEFA Europa League match against Bayer Leverkusen in a 3–2 (5–3) penalty shootout loss on 23 February 2023.

International career
Diop is a youth international for France, having played for the France U19s in 2022.

Personal life
Born in France, Diop was born to a Senegalese father and Moroccan mother. His older brother Sofiane Diop is also a professional footballer.

Playing style
Diop is a modern box-to-box midfielder, he is skilled both offensively and defensively. He is a capable goalscorer, having scored several for the Monaco youth side's and as a youth international.

References

External links
 AS Monaco Profile
 Ligue 1 profile
 

2004 births
Living people
Sportspeople from Tours, France
French footballers
France youth international footballers
French sportspeople of Moroccan descent
French sportspeople of Senegalese descent
Association football midfielders
Ligue 1 players
AS Monaco FC players
French expatriate footballers
French expatriates in Monaco
Expatriate footballers in Monaco